Jim Blackburn may refer to:

 Jim Blackburn (baseball) (1924–1969), pitcher in Major League Baseball
 Jim Blackburn (politician) (born 1943), member of the Wyoming House of Representatives

See also

 James Blackburn (disambiguation)